The SPAD S.XV was a single-seat fighter designed and built in France and offered to fulfil a 1918 C1 specification (C1 - Chasseur single-seat).

Design and development
The specification called for the use of several different engine types, one of which was the  Gnome Monosoupape 9Nc rotary engine. Five aircraft were allocated the Gnome in response to the specification: Morane-Saulnier MoS 27, Morane-Saulnier MoS 29, Courtois-Suffit Lescop CSL-1, Nieuport 28 and SPAD S.XV.

André Herbemont, at SPAD, designed a single-bay biplane with un-staggered, equal span wooden wings and a moulded plywood monocoque fuselage. The closely cowled Gnome engine was mounted in the nose, driving a 2-bladed propeller. Two  Vickers machine-guns were mounted in the forward upper decking, firing through the propeller disc, using synchronising gear.

First flown on 31 July 1917, the relatively low power of the Gnome engine limited any performance advantage over the SPAD S.XIII, so production was not authorised. The moulded plywood monocoque fuselage concept, however, was used extensively by Herbemont in subsequent designs due to its light weight and high strength.

Operational history
None of the S.XVs were accepted by the Aviation militaire.

Variants
S.XV/1First S.XV, armed with 2x Vickers machine-guns; one built.
S.XV/2Second S.XV, reportedly completed with a slightly longer span wings and a re-designed tail; one built.
S.XV/3Third S.XV, completed with reduced chord and wing area wings and a lengthened fuselage; one built.
S.XV/4Intended to be powered by a  Le Rhône 9R, but not completed.
S.XV/5A post-war sporting aircraft, powered by an  Le Rhône 9C in a large cowling, one built for René Fonck and another for Charles Nungesser; two built.

Specifications (S.15/2)

References

External links
Military Factory: SPAD S.XV

1910s French fighter aircraft
Military aircraft of World War I
S.XV
Aircraft first flown in 1917
Biplanes
Single-engined tractor aircraft